Gordana "Goca" Tržan (born 8 July 1974) is a Serbian singer, actress and television personality.

Life and career
Tržan rose to prominence as a member of the Belgrade-based group Tap 011, which was formed in 1994. After four albums released with the group, in 1999, she pursued a solo career. Her debut album, U niskom letu was released in 1999 under PGP-RTS.

In 2001, Tržan held a concert at Sava Centar in Belgrade, which was famously attended by one male admirer who bought all the tickets. She performed at the venue again in March 2009. Tržan has collectively released five studio albums and has also had numerous standalone singles, including "Voleo si skota" (2013), "Gluve usne" (2014), "Pozovi ga ti" (2015), "Gradske kučke" (2015) and "Lažna krila" (2016). 

Beyond her music career, she had a recurring role in the television series Selo gori, a baba se češlja. In 2010, Tržan also appeared on Survivor Srbija VIP: Philippines, where she made it to top four. Furthermore, she served as a judge on the children's singing competition Pinkove Zvezdice (2014-2019).

Personal life
Tržan has a daughter Lena Marinković ( 2006) with former husband and reality TV personality, Ivan Marinković. 

On 20 September 2015, she married drummer Raša Novaković.

Discography
Studio albums
 U niskom letu (1999)
 Želim da se promenim (2001)
 Peta strana sveta (2002)
 Otrov u čaj (2004)
 Plavi ram (2008)

Filmography

See also
Music of Serbia
Serbian pop

References

External links
 
 

 Interview with Goca Tržan

1974 births
Living people
Singers from Belgrade
21st-century Serbian women singers
Serbian pop singers
Serbian people of Slovenian descent